Bothrocophias myersi, commonly known as the Myers toadheaded pitviper, is a species of venomous pit viper.

Geographic range
The snake is present in the Pacific departments of Cauca and Valle del Cauca in Colombia. It occurs between 75 and 200 meters of altitude.

Etymology
The specific name, myersi, is in honor of the herpetologist Charles William Myers.

References 

Reptiles described in 2001
Reptiles of Colombia
Endemic fauna of Colombia
Viperinae